Monica Seles defeated Anke Huber in the final, 6–4, 6–1 to win the women's singles tennis title at the 1996 Australian Open. It was Seles' fourth Australian Open title and ninth major title overall, and her only major title after her 1993 stabbing.

Mary Pierce was the defending champion, but lost to Elena Likhovtseva in the second round.

Seeds

Qualifying

Draw

Finals

Top half

Section 1

Section 2

Section 3

Section 4

Bottom half

Section 5

Section 6

Section 7

Section 8

External links
 1996 Australian Open – Women's draws and results at the International Tennis Federation

Women's singles
Australian Open (tennis) by year – Women's singles
1996 in Australian women's sport
1996 WTA Tour